The Ford Credit 125 was a NASCAR SuperTruck Series presented by Craftsman race held at Mesa Marin Raceway in Bakersfield, California on April 22, 1995.

Report
Pole position for the race was won by Mike Skinner, who was the fastest in qualifying for the third time in the series' four races to that point. P. J. Jones qualified second, while Bill Sedgwick, Dave Rezendes and Jack Sprague filled out the top five qualifying spots. Thirty-five trucks attempted to qualify for the thirty-truck starting grid; Steve McEachern, Jerry Glanville, Mike Hurlbert, Bob Jones and T. J. Clark failed to qualify for the event.

The race was won by Ron Hornaday Jr., driving the No. 16 Chevrolet for Dale Earnhardt, Inc.; Hornaday led 106 of the race's 125 laps, and won by 1.3 seconds over Bill Sedgwick. Mike Bliss, polesitter Mike Skinner and Butch Miller completed the top five finishers, while Jack Sprague, Bob Keselowski, Joe Ruttman, Scott Lagasse and Sammy Swindell rounded out the top ten. Nine trucks finished on the lead lap; four caution flags slowed the event for 18 laps. All but one of the 30 trucks that started the race finished the event, the No. 2 of Dave Ashley dropping out of the race after 77 laps with engine failure. The event, aired on ABC, was the first SuperTruck Series event to be aired on a national broadcast network.

Results

References

1995 in sports in California
1995 in NASCAR
April 1995 sports events in the United States
Former NASCAR races